The 2013–14 UMKC Kangaroos men's basketball team represented the University of Missouri–Kansas City during the 2013–14 NCAA Division I men's basketball season. The Kangaroos were led by new head coach Kareem Richardson. They played most of their home games at the Municipal Auditorium, with a few games also being held at the Independence Events Center. This was their first year as a member Western Athletic Conference. They finished the season 10–20, 7–9 in WAC play to finish in a tie for fifth place. They lost in the quarterfinals of the WAC tournament to Idaho.

Roster

Schedule

|-
!colspan=9 style="background:#006699; color:#FFCC00;"| Exhibition

|-
!colspan=9 style="background:#006699; color:#FFCC00;"| Regular season

|-
!colspan=9 style="background:#006699; color:#FFCC00;"| WAC tournament

See also
 2013–14 UMKC Kangaroos women's basketball team

References

Kansas City Roos men's basketball seasons
UMKC
UMKC Kanga
UMKC Kanga